Phtheochroa kenneli is a species of moth of the family Tortricidae. It is found in southern Ukraine, the south-eastern Urals, the Caucasus, the Near East and Iran.

The wingspan is about 16–17 mm. Adults have been recorded on wing from July to October.

References

Moths described in 1944
Phtheochroa